Ruud Knuppe (6 August 1938, Amsterdam - 19 April 2002, Jisp) was a Dutch sprint canoer who competed in the early 1960s. At the 1960 Summer Olympics in Rome, he finished seventh in the K-2 1000 m event while being eliminated in the heats of the K-1 4 × 500 m event.

References
Sports-reference.com profile

1938 births
2002 deaths
Canoeists at the 1960 Summer Olympics
Dutch male canoeists
Olympic canoeists of the Netherlands
Sportspeople from Amsterdam
20th-century Dutch people
21st-century Dutch people